Afrocarpus gracilior (syn. Podocarpus gracilior) is a species of coniferous tree in the family Podocarpaceae known as benet in Marakwet and East African yellowwood, African fern tree, or bastard yellowwood in English

It is native to eastern Africa, in Ethiopia, Kenya, Tanzania, and Uganda, in Afromontane habitats.

This is a common species found in many types of tropical mountain forest habitat. It is a dominant species in some areas. Nevertheless, it may be in slow decline due to deforestation and logging.

Description

Afrocarpus gracilior is a medium-sized tree, growing 20–40 m tall, rarely to 50 m, with a trunk diameter of 50–80 cm.

The seed cones are highly modified, with a single  diameter seed with a thin fleshy coating borne on a short peduncle. The mature seed is purple, and is dispersed by birds and monkeys which eat the fleshy coating. The pollen cones are solitary or in clusters of two or three on a short stem.

Taxonomy
Studies in 2000 and 2002 provided enough evidence to support splitting the genus Podocarpus into Podocarpus and Afrocarpus. Thus, P. falcatus and P. gracilior were renamed to A. falcatus and A. gracilior. Later DNA, biogeographical, morphological, and anatomical evidence suggested the following relationships between the species of Afrocarpus:

Uses
It is an important timber tree in its native range, where it is harvested for local use and export. It is used for construction of buildings and furniture. It is grown in plantations elsewhere in the world.

It is cultivated as an ornamental tree, and planted as a shade tree.

Notes
Dallimore, W., & Jackson, A. B. (1966). A Handbook of Coniferae and Ginkgoaceae, 4th ed., revised. Edward Arnold.

References

External links

Podocarpaceae
Flora of Ethiopia
Flora of Kenya
Flora of Tanzania
Flora of Uganda
Trees of Africa
Afromontane flora
Least concern biota of Africa